Louis de Gallois (1775–1825) was a French engineer.

1775 births
1825 deaths
École Polytechnique alumni
French engineers
French railway pioneers